Ugo Locatelli (5 February 1916 – 28 May 1993) was an Italian international footballer who played as a midfielder or as a forward. Regarded as one of Italy's greatest players, he won a gold medal at the 1936 Summer Olympics and a winner's medal at the 1938 FIFA World Cup while playing with the Italy national football team, and is only one of four Italian players to have managed this achievement.

Club career
Locatelli was born in Toscolano-Maderno, near Brescia, Lombardy. At club level, he had a successful career, winning the Scudetto twice with Internazionale, in 1938 and 1940. He first played for Brescia between 1933 and 1936, aside from a brief loan to Atalanta, before transferring over to Inter, which was known as Ambrosiana Inter Milan at the time, where he remained until 1941. He ended his career with Juventus in 1949 following his transfer to the club in 1941, winning the Coppa Italia in 1942.

International career
A midfielder in Vittorio Pozzo's Italian national teams, he appeared in 22 matches for the azzurri, first playing in the first round match in the 1936 Summer Olympics versus the United States, as Italy went on to win a gold medal in the tournament. He later also went on to win a winner's medal at the 1938 FIFA World Cup with Italy, and was named to the All-Star Team of the tournament. Locatelli is one of only four Italians to have been doubly honoured at the Olympics and a World Cup; he never appeared on a losing side for the Italian national team.

Style of play
Locatelli was a small, quick, and agile player, with good technique, who also possessed an accurate shot, despite his lack of striking power. He initially began his career as a centre-forward, and was later deployed as a defensive central midfielder whilst at Juventus under Umberto Caligaris. During his time with Atalanta, he also played as an offensive central midfielder.

Honours

Club
Brescia
 Serie B Runner-up: 1932–33

Ambrosiana Inter
 Serie A Winner: 1937–38, 1939–40
 Coppa Italia Winner: 1938–39

Juventus
 Coppa Italia Winner: 1941–42
 Serie A Runner-up: 1940–41

International
Italy
 Olympic Gold Medal: 1936
 FIFA World Cup: 1938

Individual
 FIFA World Cup All-Star Team: 1938

References

External links
Career statistics 
DatabaseOlympics.com profile
Juventus Profile
1938 FIFA World Cup Final Line-up
All Star Team of the 1938 FIFA World Cup
Gold Medal Winning team of the 1936 Olympic Football Tournament

1916 births
1993 deaths
Sportspeople from the Province of Brescia
Association football midfielders
Association football forwards
Italian footballers
Italy international footballers
Footballers at the 1936 Summer Olympics
Olympic gold medalists for Italy
Olympic footballers of Italy
1938 FIFA World Cup players
FIFA World Cup-winning players
Brescia Calcio players
Inter Milan players
Juventus F.C. players
Serie A players
Serie B players
Olympic medalists in football
Medalists at the 1936 Summer Olympics
Footballers from Lombardy